"Black & White Radio" is a single by Australian rock group British India, taken from their debut album Guillotine.

Track listing

Release history

External links

British India (band) songs
2006 singles
2006 songs
Song recordings produced by Harry Vanda